Qal'at al-Jaras ( qal‘at al-jarāṣ) is a Syrian village located in Al-Suqaylabiyah Nahiyah in Al-Suqaylabiyah District, Hama. According to the Syria Central Bureau of Statistics (CBS), the village had a population of 776 in the 2004 census.

References 

Populated places in al-Suqaylabiyah District